New Hampshire is a state in the New England region of the northeastern United States and was one of the Thirteen Colonies that revolted against British rule in the American Revolution. One of the smallest states in area and population, it was part of New England's textile economy between the Civil War and World War II, and in recent decades is known for its presidential primary, outdoor recreation, and being part of the biotech industry and elite educational schools centered around Boston, Massachusetts.

Founding: 17th century–1775

Various Algonquian-speaking Abenaki tribes, largely divided between the Androscoggin and Pennacook nations, inhabited the area before European settlement. Despite the similar language, they had a very different culture and religion from other Algonquian peoples. English and French explorers visited New Hampshire in 1600–1605, and David Thompson settled at Odiorne's Point in present-day Rye in 1623. The first permanent settlement was at Hilton's Point (present-day Dover). By 1631, the Upper Plantation comprised modern-day Dover, Durham and Stratham; in 1679, it became the "Royal Province". Dummer's War was fought between the colonists and the Wabanaki Confederacy throughout New Hampshire.

The colony that became the state of New Hampshire was founded on the division in 1629 of a land grant given in 1622 by the Council for New England to Captain John Mason (former governor of Newfoundland) and Sir Ferdinando Gorges (who founded Maine). The colony was named New Hampshire by Mason after the English county of Hampshire, one of the first Saxon shires. Hampshire was itself named after the port of Southampton, which was known previously as simply "Hampton".

New Hampshire was first settled by Europeans at Odiorne's Point in Rye (near Portsmouth) by a group of fishermen from England, under David Thompson in 1623, three years after the Pilgrims landed at Plymouth.  Early historians believed the first native-born New Hampshirite, John Thompson, was born there.

Fisherman David Thompson had been sent by Mason, to be followed a few years later by Edward and William Hilton. They led an expedition to the vicinity of Dover, which they called Northam. Mason died in 1635 without ever seeing the colony he founded. Settlers from Pannaway, moving to the Portsmouth region later and combining with an expedition of the new Laconia Company (formed 1629) under Captain Neal, called their new settlement Strawbery Banke. In 1638 Exeter was founded by John Wheelwright.

In 1631, Captain Thomas Wiggin served as the first governor of the Upper Plantation (comprising modern-day Dover, Durham and Stratham). All the towns agreed to unite in 1639, but meanwhile Massachusetts had claimed the territory. In 1641, an agreement was reached with Massachusetts to come under its jurisdiction. Home rule of the towns was allowed. In 1653, Strawbery Banke petitioned the General Court of Massachusetts to change its name to Portsmouth, which was granted.

The relationship between Massachusetts and the independent New Hampshirites was controversial and tenuous, and complicated by land claims maintained by the heirs of John Mason. In 1679 King Charles II separated New Hampshire from Massachusetts, issuing a charter for the royal Province of New Hampshire, with John Cutt as governor. New Hampshire was absorbed into the Dominion of New England in 1686, which collapsed in 1689. After a brief period without formal government (the settlements were de facto ruled by Massachusetts) William III and Mary II issued a new provincial charter in 1691. From 1699 to 1741 the governors of Massachusetts were also commissioned as governors of New Hampshire.

The province's geography placed it on the frontier between British and French colonies in North America, and it was for many years subjected to native claims, especially in the central and northern portions of its territory. Because of these factors it was on the front lines of many military conflicts, including King William's War, Queen Anne's War, Father Rale's War, and King George's War. By the 1740s most of the native population had either been killed or driven out of the province's territory.

Because New Hampshire's governorship was shared with that of Massachusetts, border issues between the two colonies were not properly adjudicated for many years. These issues principally revolved around territory west of the Merrimack River, which issuers of the Massachusetts and New Hampshire charters had incorrectly believed to flow primarily from west to east. In the 1730s New Hampshire political interest led by Lieutenant Governor John Wentworth were able to raise the profile of these issues to colonial officials and the crown in London, even while Governor and Massachusetts native Jonathan Belcher preferentially granted land to Massachusetts interests in the disputed area. In 1741 King George II ruled that the border with Massachusetts was approximately what it is today, and also separated the governorships of the two provinces. Benning Wentworth in 1741 became the first non-Massachusetts governor since Edward Cranfield succeeded John Cutt in the 1680s.

Wentworth promptly complicated New Hampshire's territorial claims by interpreting the provincial charter to include territory west of the Connecticut River, and began issuing land grants in this territory, which was also claimed by the Province of New York. The so-called New Hampshire Grants area became a subject of contention from the 1740s until the 1790s, when it was admitted to the United States as the state of Vermont.

Slavery in New Hampshire
As in the other Thirteen Colonies and elsewhere in the colonial Americas, racially conditioned slavery was a firmly established institution in New Hampshire.  The New Hampshire Assembly in 1714 passed "An Act To Prevent Disorders In The Night": 

Notices emphasizing and re-affirming the curfew were published in The New Hampshire Gazette in 1764 and 1771.

"Furthermore, as one of the few colonies that did not impose a tariff on slaves, New Hampshire became a base for slaves to be imported into America then smuggled into other colonies. Every census up to the Revolution showed an increase in black population, though they remained proportionally fewer than in most other New England colonies."

The New Hampshire legislature would not officially eliminate slavery in the state until 1857, long after the death of many of the signatories. The 1840 United States Census was the last to enumerate any slaves in the households of the state.

While the number of slaves resident in New Hampshire itself dwindled during the course of the 19th century, the state's economy remained closely interlinked with, and dependent upon, the economies of the slave states. Slave-produced raw materials, such as cotton for textiles, and slave-manufactured goods were imported. The ship Nightingale of Boston, built in Eliot, Maine in 1851 and outfitted in Portsmouth, would serve as a slave ship before its capture by the African Slave Trade Patrol in 1861, indicating the region's further economic connection to the ongoing Atlantic slave trade.

Revolution: 1775–1815

New Hampshire was one of the Thirteen Colonies that revolted against British rule during the American Revolution. The Massachusetts Provincial Congress called upon the other New England colonies for assistance in raising an army. In response, on May 22, 1775, the New Hampshire Provincial Congress voted to raise a volunteer force to join the patriot army at Boston. In January 1776, it became the first colony to set up an independent government and the first to establish a constitution, but the latter explicitly stated "we never sought to throw off our dependence on Great Britain", meaning that it was not the first to actually declare its independence (that distinction instead belongs to Rhode Island). The historic attack on Fort William and Mary (now Fort Constitution) helped supply the cannon and ammunition  for the Continental Army that was needed for the Battle of Bunker Hill that took place north of Boston a few months later. New Hampshire raised three regiments for the Continental Army, the 1st, 2nd and 3rd New Hampshire regiments. New Hampshire Militia units were called up to fight at the Battle of Bunker Hill, Battle of Bennington, Saratoga Campaign and the Battle of Rhode Island. John Paul Jones' ship the Sloop-of-war USS Ranger and the frigate USS Raleigh were built in Portsmouth, New Hampshire, along with other naval ships for the Continental Navy and privateers to hunt down British merchant shipping.

Concord was named the state capital in 1808.

Industrialization, abolitionism and nativism-- politics: 1815–1860

In 1832, New Hampshire saw a curious development: the founding of the Republic of Indian Stream on its northern border with Canada over the unresolved post-revolutionary war border issue. In 1835 the so-called "republic" was annexed by New Hampshire, with the dispute finally resolved in 1842 by the Webster–Ashburton Treaty.

Abolitionists from Dartmouth College founded the experimental, interracial Noyes Academy in Canaan, New Hampshire in 1835, at a point in history when slaves still appeared in the households of New Hampshire in the census. Rural opponents of the school eventually dragged the school away with oxen before lighting it ablaze to protest integrated education, within months of the school's founding.

Abolitionist sentiment was a strong undercurrent in the state, with significant support given the Free Soil Party of John P. Hale. However the conservative Jacksonian Democrats usually maintained control, under the leadership of editor Isaac Hill.

Nativism aimed at the rapid influx of Irish Catholics characterized the short-lived secret Know Nothing movement, and its instrument the "American Party." Appearing out of nowhere, they scored a landslide in 1855. They won 51% of the vote against a divided opposition. They won over 94% of the men who voted Free Soil the year before. They won 79% of the Whigs, plus 15% of Democrats and 24% of those who abstained in the 1854 election for governor.  In full control of the legislature, the Know Nothings enacted their entire agenda.  According to Lex Renda, they battled traditionalism and promoted rapid modernization. They extended the waiting period for citizenship to slow down the growth of Irish power; they reformed the state courts. They expanded the number and power of banks; they strengthened corporations; they defeated a proposed 10-hour law that would help workers. They reformed the tax system; increased state spending on public schools; set up a system to build high schools; prohibited the sale of liquor; and they denounced the expansion of slavery in the western territories. 

The Whigs and Free Soil parties both collapsed in New Hampshire in 1854-55. In the 1855 fall elections the Know Nothings again swept the state against the Democrats and the small new Republican party. When the Know Nothing ("American" Party) collapsed in 1856 and merged with the Republicans, New Hampshire now had a two party system with the Republican Party headed by Amos Tuck  edging out the Democrats.

Civil War: 1861–1865

After Abraham Lincoln gave speeches in March 1860, he was well regarded. However, the radical wing of the Republican Party increasingly took control. As early as January 1861, top officials were secretly meeting with Governor John A. Andrew of Massachusetts to coordinate plans in case the war came. Plans were made to rush militia units to Washington in an emergency.

New Hampshire fielded 31,650 soldiers and 836 officers during the American Civil War; of these, about 20% died of disease, accident or combat. The state provided eighteen volunteer infantry regiments (thirteen of which were raised in 1861 in response to Lincoln's call to arms), three rifle regiments (who served in the 1st United States Sharpshooters and 2nd United States Sharpshooters), one cavalry battalion (the 1st New Hampshire Volunteer Cavalry, which was attached to the 1st New England Volunteer Cavalry), and two artillery units (the 1st New Hampshire Light Battery and 1st New Hampshire Heavy Artillery), as well as additional troops for the Navy and Marine Corps.

Among the most celebrated of New Hampshire's units was the 5th New Hampshire Volunteer Infantry, commanded by Colonel Edward Ephraim Cross. Called the "Fighting Fifth" in newspaper accounts, the regiment was considered among the Union's best both during the war (Major General Winfield Scott called the regiment "refined gold" in 1863) and by historians afterward. The Civil War veteran and early Civil War historian William F. Fox determined that this regiment had the highest number of battle-related deaths of any Union regiment. The 20th-century historian Bruce Catton said that the Fifth New Hampshire was "one of the best combat units in the army" and that Cross was "an uncommonly talented regimental commander."

The critical post of state Adjutant General was held in 1861-64 by elderly politician Anthony C. Colby (1792-1873) and his son Daniel E. Colby (1816-1891). They were patriotic, but were overwhelmed with the complexity of their duties. The state had no track of soldiers who enlisted after 1861; no personnel records or information on volunteers, substitutes, or draftees. There was no inventory of weaponry and supplies. Nathaniel Head (1828-1883) took over in 1864, obtained an adequate budget and office staff, and reconstructed the missing paperwork. As a result, widows, orphans, and disabled veterans received the postwar payments they had earned.

Prosperity, depression and war: 1865–1950

Between 1884 and 1903, New Hampshire attracted many immigrants. French Canadian migration to the state was significant, and at the turn of the century, French Canadians represented 16 percent of the state's population, and one-fourth the population of Manchester. Polish immigration to the state was also significant; there were about 850 Polish Americans in Manchester in 1902.

The textile industry was hit hard by the depression and growing competition from southern mills. The closing of the Amoskeag Mills in 1935 was a major blow to Manchester, as was the closing of the former Nashua Manufacturing Company mill in Nashua in 1949 and the bankruptcy of the Brown Company paper mill in Berlin in the 1940s, which led to new ownership.

Modern New Hampshire: 1950–present
The post-World War II decades have seen New Hampshire increase its economic and cultural links with the greater Boston, Massachusetts, region. This reflects a national trend, in which improved highway networks have helped metropolitan areas expand into formerly rural areas or small nearby cities.

The replacement of the Nashua textile mill with defense electronics contractor Sanders Associates in 1952 and the arrival of minicomputer giant Digital Equipment Corporation in the early 1970s helped lead the way toward southern New Hampshire's role as a high-tech adjunct of the Route 128 corridor.

The postwar years saw the rise of New Hampshire's political primary for President of the United States, which as the first primary in the quadrennial campaign season draws enormous attention.

See also

Abenaki
History of New England
List of newspapers in New Hampshire in the 18th century
New Hampshire historical markers
Timeline of Manchester, New Hampshire
 Union (American Civil War)

References

Resources
 Online books: New Hampshire
 New Hampshire: a Guide to the Granite State: "Chronology". Boston: Houghton Mifflin American Guide Series. Federal Writers' Project (1938)

Further reading
 Appleton's Annual Cyclopedia...1863 (1864), detailed coverage of events in all countries; online; for online copies see Annual Cyclopaedia. Each year includes several pages on each U.S. state.

 Anderson, Leon W. To this day: the 300 years of the New Hampshire Legislature (Phoenix Pub., 1981).

 Belknap, Jeremy. The History of New Hampshire (1791–1792) 3 vol classic Volume 1, or the  1862 edition with corrections. at books. Google.
 Cole, Donald B. Jacksonian Democracy in New Hampshire (Harvard UP, 1970) online
 Daniell, Jere. Experiment in Republicanism: New Hampshire politics and the American Revolution, 1741-1794 (1970)online
 Daniell, Jere. Colonial New Hampshire: A History (1982), scholarly history. online
 Dwight, Timothy. Travels Through New England and New York (circa 1800) 4 vol. (1969) online
 French, Laurence Armand. Frog Town: Portrait of a French Canadian Parish in New England (University Press of America, 2014) online.
 Guyol, Philip Nelson. Democracy Fights: A History of New Hampshire in World War II (Dartmouth, 1951).

 Hareven, Tamara K., and Randolph Langenbach. Amoskeag: Life and work in an American factory-city (UPNE, 1995) The Amoskeag textile factory in Manchester was the largest in the world; this is the story of its workers. online

 Heffernan, Nancy Coffey, and Ann Page Stecker. New Hampshire: crosscurrents in its development (1986) short popular history. online

 Jager, Ronald and Grace Jager. The Granite State New Hampshire: An Illustrated History (2000) popular.
 Kilbourne, Frederick Wilkinson. Chronicles of the White Mountains (1916) online.

 Kinney, Charles B. Church & state: the struggle for separation in New Hampshire 1630-1900 (1955).

 Lafferty, Ben Paul. American Intelligence: Small-Town News and Political Culture in Federalist New Hampshire (U of Massachusetts Press, 2020) 

 Lafferty, Ben Paul. "Joseph Dennie and The Farmer's Weekly Museum: Readership and Pseudonymous Celebrity in Early National Journalism," American Nineteenth Century History, 15:1, 67-87, DOI: 10.1080/14664658.2014.892302

McClintock, John N.  Colony, Province, State, 1623-1888: History of New Hampshire  Published 1889.
 Morison, Elizabeth Forbes and Elting E. Morison. New Hampshire: A Bicentennial History (1976); popular
 Nichols, Roy F. Franklin Pierce: Young Hickory of the Granite Hills (1931). online
 Palfrey, John Gorham.  History of New England (5 vol 1859–90)

 Renda, Lex. Running on the Record: Civil War-Era Politics in New Hampshire (University of Virginia Press, 1997)  
 Renda, Lex. "Credit and Culpability: New Hampshire State Politics During the Civil War," Historical New Hampshire 48 (Spring, 1993), 3-84. reprinted in his book.

 Sanborn, Edwin David.  History of New Hampshire, from Its First Discovery to the Year 1830 (1875, 422 pages)
 Sewell, Richard H. John P. Hale and the politics of abolition (1965) online

 Smith, Norman W. A mature frontier: the New Hampshire economy 1790-1850 Historical New Hampshire 24#1 (1969) 3-19.

 Squires, J. Duane. The Granite State of the United States: A History of New Hampshire from 1623 to the Present (1956) vol 1
 Stackpole, Everett S. History of New Hampshire (4 vol 1916-1922) vol 4 online covers Civil War and late 19th century
 Thompson, Woodrow. "History of research on glaciation in the White Mountains, New Hampshire (USA)." Géographie physique et Quaternaire 53.1 (1999): 7-24. online

 Turner, Lynn Warren. The Ninth State: New Hampshire's Formative Years (1983) 
 Upton, Richard Francis. Revolutionary New Hampshire: An Account of the Social and Political Forces Underlying the Transition from Royal Province to American Commonwealth (1936)
 Whiton, John Milton .  Sketches of the History of New-Hampshire, from Its Settlement in 1623, to 1833. Published 1834, 222 pages.
 Wilson, H. F. The Hill Country of Northern New England: Its Social and Economic History, 1790–1930 (1936)
 

 
New Hampshire